Peepshow is the title of a 1992 comic book collection and an ongoing autobiographical comic book by American cartoonist Joe Matt, both published by Drawn & Quarterly.  The book collects strips published in various publications from before the Peepshow series started.

Story arcs 

The story is divided into three story arcs:

 #1–6 — about Matt's relationship with his girlfriend Trish and their breakup.  Collected in the book The Poor Bastard, 2002.
 #7–10 — deals with Matt's childhood and family.  Collected in the book Fair Weather, 2002.
 #11–14 — depicts Matt arguing with his cartoonist friends and obsessing over his addiction to pornography. A new, cleaner style of drawing was adopted for this storyline.  Printed in two colors on tinted paper.  Collected in the book Spent, 2007.

List of issues

Collected editions
{| class="wikitable"
|-
|+ Peepshow collections
|-
! scope="col" style="background:#B0C4DE;" | Title
! scope="col" style="background:#B0C4DE;" | Date
! scope="col" style="background:#B0C4DE;" | Contents
! scope="col" style="background:#B0C4DE;" | ISBN
! scope="col" style="background:#B0C4DE;" class="unsortable" | Notes
|-
! scope="row"|Peepshow : The Cartoon Diary of Joe Matt
|1992
|strips from 1987 to 1992.
|Softcover: 
|
Originally published by Kitchen Sink Press
Republished by Drawn & Quarterly in 1999
|-
! scope="row" |The Poor Bastard
|1996
|Peepshow #1–6
|Hardcover: Softcover: 
|
|-
! scope="row" |Fair Weather
|2002
|Peepshow #7–10
|Hardcover:Softcover: 
|
|-
! scope="row" |Spent
|2007
|Peepshow #11–14
|Hardcover: 
|
|-
|}

Animated TV series
In 2004, it was reported that HBO was developing an animated series based on The Poor Bastard that would be produced by Matt and David X. Cohen. This project was abandoned in 2005.

References

External links
preview of the Peepshow collection at Drawn & Quarterly's website
preview of The Poor Bastard at Drawn & Quarterly's website
preview of Fair Weather at Drawn & Quarterly's website
preview of Spent at Drawn & Quarterly's website

Drawn & Quarterly titles
Autobiographical comics
Slice of life comics